Muhammad Alif bin Mohd Satar (Jawi: اليف ساتر; born September 19, 1990) is a Malaysian singer, actor and television host.

Alif started his singing career after winning third place in 8TV's reality singing competition, One in a Million (OIAM), in its inaugural season in 2006. He has released three albums so far – Nakal (2009), Lelaki Seperti Aku (2011) and Definisi (2013).

Career
At the age of 16, Alif started his singing career by becoming the contestant of the reality television series One in a Million, which aired on 8TV. He is the youngest contestant on the show.

Alif ranked at No. 11 on the Top 20 Knock-out show and emerged as one of the Top 12 contestants. Alif made it to the Grand Finale of the reality television show, defeating professional singer Dayang Nurfaizah who landed in fourth place. The competition ended on September 22, 2006. Alif was placed in third with Suki Low in first and Faizal Tahir in second.

Before entering the show, Alif performed mostly at events in school and was once cast as one of the Lost Boys in the West End production, Peter Pan – The Musical, in Genting Highlands when he was 14. He also initially wanted to be a pilot when he auditioned for reality singing competition, One in a Million.

Alif was featured in Ricky Martin's 2014 FIFA World Cup's song with Judika from Indonesia and Sezairi Sezali from Singapore. They recorded the song in different studios but the Asian singers met each other to promote the single.

Alif's acting career started in 2008 when he got a role in television series called Dendam which means Revenge. After that, his acting has been more recognized by fans after starring in romance television series called Dia Semanis Honey and other popular dramas. Also, 
due to the popularity of the drama Dia Semanis Honey. It has been made into a musical theater, which attracts the interest of the television series fans.

In 2019, he appointed as the ambassador of the newly-opened Harman Studio in Sunway Geo Avenue.

He collaborated with Malaysian nasheed group Raihan to re-recorded new version of their 1997 song "Sesungguhnya" ("Indeed"). Released under the title "Sesungguhnya '19", the song was released on 10 May.

On July 31, 2019, Alif released his new single song and music video called I Want You To Love Me.

One in a Million performances
Throughout the competition, Alif sang:

 This Love – Maroon 5 (Top 20)
 Pria Terhebat – Sheila on 7 (Top 12)
 Mama Tolong Percaya – Exist (Top 10)
 Lonely No More – Rob Thomas (Top 9)
 Unwell – matchbox twenty (Top 8)
 Feeling Good – Michael Bublé (Top 7)
 Harder to Breathe – Maroon 5 (Top 6)
 Tak Bisakah – Peter Pan (Top 6)
 Ain't No Other Man – Christina Aguilera (Top 5)
 The Remedy – Jason Mraz (Top 5)
 Footloose – Kenny Loggins (Top 4)
 Pretty Young Thing – Michael Jackson (duet with Reshmonu) (Top 4)
 The Call – Backstreet Boys (Top 3)
 Namun Ku Punya Hati – (Top 3)
 Khayal – Original composition (Grand Finale)
 Give Me Just One Night – 98 Degrees (Grand Finale)

Personal life
On January 14, 2014, Alif had asked for his girlfriend's hand in marriage, Sha Dila Halid (born 1984) who is also his manager after knowing her for four years. He married Sha Dila, who is six years older than him on September 15, 2014 and the ceremony was held at Perdana Felda Hall.

On May 31, 2015, Alif and wife welcomed their firstborn child who was born at Pantai Hospital, Kuala Lumpur. The baby girl was named Alisha Anugerah. On February 2, 2017, Alif shared on his social account media Instagram that he became a father again to another beautiful baby girl. The couple welcomed their second daughter, Ariana Mecca, at Pantai Hospital, Kuala Lumpur.

On November 17, 2018, Alif was a participant in Ironman race for the first time at Pantai Cenang on Langkawi Island. The Ironman 70.3 is also dubbed the Half Ironman, which covers half the distance of the actual annual triathlon race.

Alif and his wife Sha Dila welcomes their third child, a boy named Muhammad ‘Ali, exactly on what would have been Alif’s 29th birthday on September 19, 2019.

Discography

Album

Singles

Filmography

Film

Television series

Television movie

Theater

Television

References

External links

1990 births
Living people
21st-century Malaysian male actors
Malaysian people of Malay descent
Malaysian Muslims
Malaysian television personalities
Malaysian male film actors
Malaysian male television actors
People from Kuala Lumpur
One in a Million (Malaysian TV series) participants